Kitchen maid may refer to:

Kitchen maid (domestic worker), a domestic worker
Kitchen maid (pulley airer), a laundry airer

See also 
 The Kitchen Maid (disambiguation)